Cecilie Vedel Pedersen (born 19 March 1983) is a Danish former footballer. She played for Elitedivisionen club Brøndby IF and also represented the Denmark national team.

Club career

Pedersen made a total of 89 appearances for Brøndby between 2000 and 2006, scoring nine goals. She was part of the Brøndby team which reached the 2003–04 UEFA Women's Cup semi-finals.

International career

Pedersen represented Denmark at the 2002 FIFA U-19 Women's World Championship in Canada. She made her debut for the senior Denmark women's national football team in October 2002; a 2–0 defeat by Germany in Ulm. She was named in national coach Peter Bonde's squad for UEFA Women's Euro 2005, where Denmark were eliminated at the group stage.

Personal life

After injury ended Pedersen's football career, she began a relationship with her Indian yoga instructor Rahul Alinje. In December 2015 they were married in Manmad, India, in a traditional Marathi Buddhist ceremony.

References

External links
Danish Football Union (DBU) statistics 

1983 births
Living people
Danish women's footballers
Denmark women's international footballers
Brøndby IF (women) players
Women's association football midfielders